This is a list of national Greek umbrella councils for fraternities and sororities in North America (Greek lettered organizations).

 Association of College Honor Societies (ACHS) - association of 66 national honors and leadership societies
 Concilio Interfraternitario Puertorriqueño de la Florida (Puerto Rican Interfraternity Council of Florida) (CIPFI) - council formed by the five largest fraternities from Puerto Rico with chapters in Florida
 National APIDA Panhellenic Association (NAPA) - association formed by 14 of the largest and most established Asian Greek lettered organizations
 National Association of Latino Fraternal Organizations (NALFO) - association formed by 20 of the largest and most established Latino Greek lettered organizations
 National Interfraternity Music Council (NIMC) - council formed by seven of the largest and most established Music fraternities and sororities
 National Multicultural Greek Council (NMGC) - council formed by 11 of the largest and most established Multicultural Greek lettered organizations
 National Pan-Hellenic Council (NPHC) - council formed by the nine largest and most established Black Greek lettered organizations, the "Divine Nine"
 National Panhellenic Conference (NPC) - conference formed by 26 national Greek lettered sororities and women's fraternities
 North American Interfraternity Conference (NIC) - conference formed by 75 national fraternities
 Professional Fraternity Association (PFA) - association of 36 national collegiate professional, service and honor fraternities
 Tau Kappa Phi Incorporated (TKPhi) - council formed by 5 national LGBTQ+ friendly Greek lettered sororities and fraternities
 United Council of Christian Fraternities & Sororities (UCCFS) - council formed by six Christian fraternities and sororities
 The United Federation of Military Greek Organizations (TUFMGO) council formed by four established Military fraternities and sororities

See also
List of defunct Greek umbrella organizations

Student societies in the United States